Yaroslav Hennadiyovych Bohunov (born 4 September 1993) is a Ukrainian professional footballer who plays for Lviv.

Career
On 6 August 2020, the Football Federation of Belarus banned Bohunov from Belarusian football for two years for his involvement in the match fixing. In January 2023 he moved to Lviv.

References

External links
 
 
 

1993 births
Living people
Footballers from Luhansk
Association football forwards
Ukrainian footballers
Ukrainian expatriate footballers
Expatriate footballers in Belarus
FC Metalist Kharkiv players
FC Belshina Bobruisk players
FC Naftan Novopolotsk players
FC Krumkachy Minsk players
FC Polissya Zhytomyr players
FC Lviv players
FC Dinaz Vyshhorod players
Ukrainian expatriate sportspeople in Belarus